Ouo is a town in the Ouo Department of Comoé Province in south-western Burkina Faso. It is the capital of Ouo Department and the town has a population of 2,204.

References

External links
Satellite map at Maplandia.com

Populated places in the Cascades Region
Comoé Province